XER can stand for:

 XER (Villa Acuña), a radio station in the early 1930s in Villa Acuña, Mexico
 XER-AM (now XHR-FM), a radio station in Linares, Nuevo León, Mexico
 XML Encoding Rules, a set of ASN.1 encoding rules for formatting data in XML
 The ICAO Code for Xerox Corporation, United States